This is a list of heritage-listed buildings in Burra, South Australia:

References

Burra, South Australia
.Bura
Bura, heritage listed buildings
Burra